RimRockers may refer to:

Arkansas RimRockers, former NBA Development League team
Billings RimRockers, former professional basketball club based in Billings, Montana